Óscar Díaz is the name of:

 Oscar Díaz (boxer) (1982–2015), American boxer
 Óscar Díaz (Colombian footballer) (born 1972), Colombian footballer
 Óscar Díaz (Spanish footballer) (born 1984), Spanish footballer
 Óscar Díaz (Paraguayan footballer) (born 1984), Paraguayan footballer
 Óscar Díaz (Bolivian footballer) (born 1985), Bolivian footballer

See also 
 Tito Díaz (born 1984), Paraguayan footballer, full name Óscar Armando Díaz